The 1902 World Allround Speed Skating Championships took place between 22 and 23 February 1902 at the Pohjoissatama ice rink in Helsinki, Finland.

Franz Wathén was the defending champion. No one won at least three distances and so no World champion was declared.

Allround results 

  * = Fell
 NC = Not classified
 NF = Not finished
 NS = Not started
 DQ = Disqualified
Source: SpeedSkatingStats.com

Rules 
Four distances have to be skated:
 500m
 1500m
 5000m
 10000m

One could only win the World Championships by winning at least three of the four distances, so there would be no World Champion if no skater won at least three distances.

Silver and bronze medals were not awarded.

References 

World Allround Speed Skating Championships, 1902
1902 World Allround
World Allround, 1902
International sports competitions in Helsinki
1902 in Finland
February 1902 sports events
1900s in Helsinki